George Herbert Utter (July 24, 1854 – November 3, 1912) was a U.S. Representative from Rhode Island and the 49th Governor of Rhode Island.

Biography
Born in Plainfield, New Jersey, Utter moved with his parents to Westerly, Rhode Island, in 1861.  He attended the public schools of Westerly and Alfred (New York) Academy.  He graduated from Amherst College, Massachusetts, in 1877.  He was engaged as a printer and publisher of the Westerly Sun before serving as a personal aide on the staff of Governor Augustus O. Bourn 1883–1885.  He served as member of the Rhode Island House of Representatives 1885–1889, serving as speaker the last year.

Utter served in the Rhode Island Senate (1889–1891), as Secretary of State of Rhode Island (1891–1894), and as Lieutenant Governor (1904) and Governor (1905–06) of Rhode Island.

Utter was elected as a Republican to the Sixty-second Congress and served from March 4, 1911, until his death from liver cancer in Westerly, Rhode Island, November 3, 1912.  At the time of his death, Utter was running for re-election to Congress.

He died on November 3, 1912, in Westerly, Rhode Island. He was interred in Riverbend Cemetery, Westerly, Rhode Island.

See also
List of United States Congress members who died in office (1900–49)

References

External links

 
 George H. Utter, late a representative from Rhode Island, Memorial addresses delivered in the House of Representatives and Senate frontispiece 1914

1854 births
1912 deaths
Amherst College alumni
Republican Party governors of Rhode Island
Lieutenant Governors of Rhode Island
Politicians from Plainfield, New Jersey
Republican Party Rhode Island state senators
Republican Party members of the Rhode Island House of Representatives
Secretaries of State of Rhode Island
People from Westerly, Rhode Island
Republican Party members of the United States House of Representatives from Rhode Island
Burials in Rhode Island
19th-century American politicians